Clare, Lady Morpurgo  (née Lane) is a philanthropist. She is the wife of British author Sir Michael Morpurgo and the eldest daughter of Sir Allen Lane, founder of Penguin Books.

Morpurgo founded the charity Farms for City Children in 1974. She and her husband are deeply involved with the charity. She is also a trustee of The Allen Lane Foundation, a grant-making charity.

She and Michael Morpurgo co-authored Wherever My Wellies Take Me (2012).

References

External links
Farms For City Children website

Living people
Members of the Order of the British Empire
Place of birth missing (living people)
Year of birth missing (living people)
20th-century British women
21st-century British women
Wives of knights